Liu Gang (born 19 March 1984) is a Chinese sport shooter.

He participated at the 2018 ISSF World Shooting Championships, winning a medal.

References

External links

Living people
1984 births
Chinese male sport shooters
ISSF rifle shooters
Sport shooters from Shenyang
Asian Games medalists in shooting
Shooters at the 2006 Asian Games
Shooters at the 2014 Asian Games
Asian Games gold medalists for China
Asian Games bronze medalists for China
Medalists at the 2006 Asian Games
Medalists at the 2014 Asian Games
21st-century Chinese people